William Bradbury Small (May 17, 1817 – April 7, 1878) was a U.S. Representative from New Hampshire.

Born in Limington in Massachusetts' District of Maine, Small moved with his parents to Ossipee, New Hampshire. He attended the public schools and Phillips Exeter Academy, Exeter, New Hampshire. He studied law and was admitted to the bar in 1846, commencing practice in Newmarket, New Hampshire, and serving as solicitor of Rockingham County. He was a member of the New Hampshire House of Representatives in 1865 and served in the New Hampshire Senate in 1870.

Small was elected as a Republican to the Forty-third Congress (March 4, 1873 – March 3, 1875). He was not a candidate for renomination in 1874. He resumed the practice of law and also engaged in banking. He died in Newmarket, New Hampshire, April 7, 1878, and was interred in Riverside Cemetery.

References

External links 
 

1817 births
1878 deaths
People from Limington, Maine
Republican Party New Hampshire state senators
Republican Party members of the New Hampshire House of Representatives
Phillips Exeter Academy alumni
Republican Party members of the United States House of Representatives from New Hampshire
19th-century American politicians
People from Newmarket, New Hampshire
People from Ossipee, New Hampshire